John Part (born 29 June 1966) is a Canadian former professional darts player and current commentator. Nicknamed Darth Maple, he is a three-times World Champion, having won the 1994 BDO World Darts Championship on his world championship debut, and the PDC World Championship in 2003 and 2008. Part is statistically North America's greatest darts player to date. He has the distinction of being the first non-UK player to win the World Championship, and the only non-European to date to win the PDC World Darts Championship.

Part's first Championship was the second time a non-seeded player won the BDO World Darts Championship, and one of the few times where a player only lost one set in the entire tournament. His nine-year gap between his first and second World Championships is tied with Ted Hankey for the longest gap between World Championships, and his third triumph in 2008 saw him become the first player in history to win a world title in three venues, and the first to win at the Alexandra Palace. His 2008 win saw him join Phil Taylor, Eric Bristow, Raymond van Barneveld and John Lowe as the only players with three or more World Championships, and become only the second player (after Taylor) to win multiple PDC titles.

In 2017, he was inducted into the PDC Hall of Fame.

Career

1987–1994: Beginnings and BDO World Championship
Born in Toronto, Ontario, Part was given a dartboard by his parents as a Christmas present in 1987 and has played the sport ever since. Though television coverage of darts in Canada is rare and live coverage is almost non-existent, Part was still able to view the World Professional Darts Championship and the World Masters, where he would learn his game from some of the most famous champions in the sport, particularly Bob Anderson. Little is known of Part's formative darts years, but he won his first significant title at the Syracuse Open in 1991 and became a professional in the same year. It is assumed he had great success in the North American circuit as he was soon representing Canada in the WDF World Cup. Part has stated that he was 'produced as a darts player by the North American game', and that his experiences playing against some of the greatest North American players of the time gave him the capability of winning world championships.

By 1993, Part was Canada's highest ranked player and was competing in prestigious events sanctioned by the British Darts Organisation. A significant win soon came in the 1993 WDF World Cup, where he and Carl Mercer won the Pairs Championship for Canada. Nevertheless, when he qualified for the 1994 BDO World Championship, he was still a relative unknown. This was the first BDO World Championship since the acrimonious split in darts, and, as a result, the field included many newcomers and debutants, including Part himself. In the first round Part defeated second seed Ronnie Baxter in straight sets, and thereafter swept through to the final beating Paul Lim, Steve McCollum and Ronnie Sharp dropping only one set en route. He faced the charismatic  veteran Bobby George in the final and won 6–0 in sets.  Little over six years after receiving his first dartboard, Part had won a World Championship; he was the first non-British player to do so, and he is one of the few players to win the tournament on their debut. Part's achievement of dropping only one set in winning a World Championship is only matched by Eric Bristow from the 1984 BDO World Darts Championship, and later by Phil Taylor in the 2001 PDC World Darts Championship.

1995–2000: Lean years and move to the PDC
Part is generally regarded to have failed to consolidate his early success for most of the 1990s. Despite more wins on the North American circuit, including the Canadian Open and Canadian National Championships in 1995, Part struggled to make an impact in the major tournaments in the United Kingdom after his 1994 BDO World Championship success at Lakeside. In the 1995 BDO World Championship, Part only won one match in defending his title; losing an epic match in the second round to Paul Williams. Part and Williams had another epic match in the first round of the 1996 BDO World Championship, this time with Part winning, but Part was unable to make it to the quarter-finals of the BDO World Championship again after 1994, while Part also failed to reach the quarter finals of the World Masters during his entire BDO career. Despite his initial whirlwind success, Part was struggling to reach the heady heights of his breakthrough win. In June 1997, Part left the British Darts Organisation and joined the rival Professional Darts Corporation, and has competed in PDC sanctioned events ever since then. In 1997 PDC World Matchplay lost to Drew O'Neill 4–6.

Joining the PDC, however, initially failed to provide the impetus that Part's results needed. His performances in the major events continued to be indifferent, including early exits in the 1998 and 1999 PDC World Championships. The new millennium, however, began to bring small success for Part. Despite a quiet 2000 PDC World Championship, where he was eliminated in the round of sixteen, he secured a smaller victory in the Eastbourne Open in 2000. Part then secured his highest placing in a major PDC event by reaching the quarter-finals of the 2000 PDC World Grand Prix. These slightly improved results were only a harbinger, however, for what was to be the most storied and successful phase of Part's career.

2001–2003: PDC World Championship and World Number One 
The 2001 PDC World Darts Championship was to be a turning point in Part's career, even though he ultimately suffered a crushing defeat in the final. Part comfortably advanced through the tournament until the semi-final, where he defeated Essex veteran Rod Harrington 6–5 in a classic contest to reach his first major PDC final. There he would meet Phil Taylor, who had won the last six world championships and was considered as darts' greatest ever player. This was Part's first meeting with Taylor in an official PDC match, but it was not a happy one. Taylor, who had been in stunning form throughout the tournament, averaged 107.46 and had a 72% checkout rate in the final, now considered one of darts' most dominant ever showings; Part only won three legs in the entire match as Taylor stormed to a 7–0 win. Taylor's performance, described as 'ludicrous' by The Guardian, while simply regarded by darts commentator Sid Waddell as a 'vicious example of near perfection' and an 'annihilation', could have seriously affected Part's confidence. But it would only provide the Canadian with further motivation to challenge the best. Over the next two years, Part won a string of minor titles, rose to number two in the world rankings and developed a rivalry with Taylor that would define this stage of his career.

But it was not without some more painful defeats at the hands of 'The Power'. In the quarter-finals of the 2001 World Matchplay, Taylor crushed Part 16–4. In the quarter-finals of the 2002 PDC World Championship, Part was again whitewashed by Taylor in a world championship, getting beaten 6–0, as the world's greatest player went on to win his eighth consecutive world championship and his tenth world championship in all. However, Part gave Taylor a serious test in the 2002 World Matchplay final. Part, in superb form and with great belief, matched Taylor throughout the match. In a first to 18 legs contest, Part led 16–15. But Taylor stunned the Canadian by winning three legs in a row to emerge an 18–16 winner in what is now regarded as a classic final. Part's wait for a first PDC major went on while Taylor's dominance continued. In October 2002, Part again reached a major final at the 2002 World Grand Prix, but the result was a similar story. This time Taylor comfortably defeated Part 7–3 in sets, although Part recovered from a slow start and a 1–5 deficit to give Taylor a challenge in the last 4 sets. Taylor and Part were now considered the two best players in the world, but there were serious doubts over whether Part could beat 'The Power' having already suffered five televised defeats, including two whitewashes in the World Championship and the painfully close loss in the 2002 World Matchplay. Going into the 2003 PDC World Championship, Taylor was the heavy favourite. However, Taylor showed more vulnerabilities during the tournament than at the previous few world championships, with both Wayne Mardle and Dennis Smith managing to win 3 sets off of Taylor. Taylor also comfortably won an anticlimactic grudge match in the semi-final against Alan Warriner by 6–1. Part, as the number two seed, reached the final as well, with a 5–3 win over Jamie Harvey in the second round, with Part hitting a vital 161 checkout when it was 3–3 in sets and 2–2 in legs with Harvey waiting on 40. Part then crushed Chris Mason 5–0 in the quarter-finals, though Part's semi-final was considerably more difficult. In a testing game, Part defeated Essex-born Kevin Painter 6–4 in a match not unlike his 2001 semi-final with Rod Harrington.

Prior to the final, the odds seemed against Part. He had lost 13 straight world championship sets to Taylor in the two years prior; and had lost all five of his televised matches against Taylor. Part had just come through a tiring semi-final against Painter, while Taylor had cruised through against Warriner. Finally, Taylor had won eight consecutive world championships and was on a 44-match winning streak in the tournament. Against the odds, Part announced his intentions immediately in the final; he checked out 121 on the bullseye in the first leg. Thereafter he stunned Taylor by racing into set leads of 3–0 and 4–1, but this only stirred Taylor into taking the next four sets and leading 5–4. This however didn't stop Part as he took the next two sets to lead 6–5 and was one set away from the world title. Taylor then took the next set to take the match into a deciding set. In the deciding set, Part broke Taylor's throw and held his nerve to win the title with his first match dart. He had become world champion for the second time and ended Taylor's eight-tournament winning streak, inflicting Taylor's first defeat at the PDC World Championship since 1994.

The final is now regularly referred to as one of the greatest ever games of darts. Part has stated this win was the most special of all of his victories.
Similar to his BDO World Championship achievement, Part was the first non-British player to win the PDC World Championship. He is also one of only four men to have won both versions of the darts world championship. With his victory, Part also ascended to world number one in the PDC world rankings.

2003–2005: Triumphs and regrets 
The immediate period following Part's second world championship victory was one of conflicting emotions. These three years were marked by two distinct and contrasting fortunes; first, Part enjoyed some success over his rival Taylor, securing a number of televised victories over his nemesis. However, he was unable to consolidate these victories in the major events, and in fact failed to add a single major title to his name from February 2003 through 2005. There were minor successes; Part won the first event he entered – the UK Open Southwest Regional Final – after his world championship triumph, beating Taylor along the way, and later in 2003 added the Windy City Open and two Vauxhall Opens to his silverware collection. But the major titles were not forthcoming. Part recorded another victory over Taylor in the 2003 Las Vegas Desert Classic semi-final, but lost in the final 16–12 in legs as Peter Manley took the crown. There were disappointing exits in the last sixteen of the 2003 UK Open and the 2003 World Matchplay, though Part made a second consecutive appearance in the World Grand Prix final. However, Taylor again comfortably defeated Part in this event, winning the final 7–2. At this point, Taylor had also retaken the world number one ranking from Part.

But the disappointment was nothing compared to what would occur in the new year, as 2004 began with one of Part's most disastrous defeats of all. The Canadian entered the 2004 PDC World Championship as the reigning champion, but was unable to win even a single match in the defence of his title. He was given a bye to the third round, where he came up against debutant Mark Dudbridge but was stunned in a 4–3 defeat. Phil Taylor would go on to retake the World Championship crown with a 7–6 win over Kevin Painter in the final. In 2004, Part had much success in North America, where he again won the Canadian Open and Canadian National Championships, as well as winning the Golden Harvest North American Cup. Despite Taylor regaining the PDC World Championship, Part once again defeated 'The Power' in the 2004 UK Open quarter-final, with an 8–6 win. Part would then go on to reach his only major final of 2004 at the same event, but would once again fail to consolidate as he was soundly beaten 11–6 in the final by Roland Scholten. At the 2004 World Matchplay, Part began with a 10–0 whitewash of Colin Monk in the first round, and then had an epic win over Bob Anderson in the second round, where Part survived four match darts against him and eventually won in a tiebreak by 17–15. In his quarter final match against Andy Jenkins, Part struggled for much of the match and trailed 7–11, but Part fought his way back to eventually win 16–14, setting up a highly anticipated semi final match against Taylor, with Part having won 3 of his previous 4 matches against Taylor on Sky Sports. Despite Part's recent wins over Taylor on TV, Part started the semi final against Taylor very poorly, averaging in the low 80s and seeing Taylor cruise to an incredible 10–0 lead on a mid 90s average, as the 150/1 shot of a 17–0 whitewash looked a possibility. However, Part improved his game from the eleventh leg onwards, but losing the first 10 legs had left Part with far too much to do. Part restored plenty of respectability after his poor start, but Taylor won the match 17–8. After beating Part, Taylor went on to beat Mark Dudbridge 18–8 in the final, to win his fifth consecutive World Matchplay title and his seventh World Matchplay title in all.

Part endured a barren 2005, failing to win a single tournament anywhere throughout the year. In the 2005 PDC World Championship, Part reached the last sixteen but came up against Dudbridge again. The Bristolian had become something of a bête noire to Part's world championship attempts, and Dudbridge beat Part again, by a 4–2 scoreline (Taylor eventually defeated Dudbridge in the final). Following the world championship, Part was invited into the inaugural Premier League, but it was not a happy campaign. Despite being in a good position after 4–5 weeks, Part then lost six successive matches towards the latter end of the league and finished sixth out of the seven participants. For Part, the highlights of 2005 were two of his most renowned televised clashes against Taylor. While 'The Power' was dominating the televised events, Part was sliding down the rankings somewhat. Nevertheless, Part proved to be Taylor's only consistent challenger during this time. In June, Part outplayed Taylor to lead 4–0, 7–1 and 10–6 in legs during their match in the Last 16 of the 2005 UK Open, but Taylor produced a remarkable comeback to win 11–10 and went on to win the tournament. Part avenged this defeat in July with an all-time classic quarter-final in the 2005 World Matchplay. Though Taylor led 4–1 in the early stages, Part hit back to lead 5–4 and 7–5. After Taylor drew level at 7–7, the two players traded legs thereafter until they were matched at 11–11. Part then started to pull away and won five straight legs to achieve a 16–11 victory over 'The Power', ending Taylor's 27-match winning streak in the World Matchplay, inflicting Taylor's first defeat at the World Matchplay since 1999. After defeating Taylor, Part faced Peter Manley in the semi finals, a match that was hyped up as a rematch of the 2003 Las Vegas Desert Classic final that Part had lost to Manley. Manley won his 2005 World Matchplay quarter final match against Wayne Mardle after coming back from 9–14 down to win 16–14. In the semi final, Part also led Manley by 14–9, and Manley threatened a similar comeback against Part as what he had done against Mardle by getting it back to 14–14 and Manley even went in front at 16–15. Part eventually won the match in a tiebreak, 18–16, to get through to the final. Part, however, was yet again a runner-up in the tournament, as Colin Lloyd beat Part 18–12 in the final, with Lloyd hitting a 170 checkout in the final leg.

Overall, covering the years of 2003, 2004 and 2005, Part defeated Taylor four times on television, meaning that Part was responsible for all but one of Taylor's five losses on television during this period – but Part went on to lose in the final in three of the four televised events where he defeated Taylor. This statistic, combined with the failed Premier League campaign and the two world championship losses to Dudbridge, made this an ultimately disappointing period for Part, reflected by his slide in the rankings.

2006–2008: Las Vegas Champion and third World Championship 
The year 2006 was seminal to both the Professional Darts Corporation, and Part's career. Concerning the former, it heralded the arrival of four-times BDO World Champion Raymond van Barneveld to the PDC. With van Barneveld's arrival and his immediate impact in the 2006 Premier League, Part was no longer perceived as Taylor's main rival (indeed, Part has not beaten Taylor in a televised match since his 2005 World Matchplay victory). Part's shaken status was not helped by a defeat in the third round of the 2006 PDC World Championship to Wayne Mardle. Despite these setbacks, Part's career experienced a somewhat fitful renewal in the three years that followed. In July, he won his first major title since the 2003 World Championship with victory in the 2006 Las Vegas Desert Classic. The Desert Classic had long been a fruitful tournament for Part; in its eight-year history he reached six semi-finals, but it was only in 2006 that he won the trophy. In 2003, he had lost out in the final to Peter Manley having beaten Phil Taylor in the semi-final; this time it was van Barneveld's turn to suffer the same fate. The Dutchman had beaten Taylor in the semi-final, and in a tense final initially matched Part 3–3. However, the Canadian won nine of the next eleven legs to secure a 6–3 victory and his second major title in the PDC.

Part's other major results in 2006 were indifferent however, including Phil Taylor defeating Part 13–2 in the second round of the 2006 World Matchplay. The match was heavily hyped up beforehand with Part and Taylor having played many classic matches before and Part having beaten Taylor four times on television. However, their match at the 2006 World Matchplay was in complete contrast to their classic matches from the past, being a flat anti-climax throughout as Taylor played below average and Part played very poor throughout. Part also had another disappointing World Championship in 2007. This time he was eliminated tamely in the second round by Chris Mason. The defeat meant that Part had not reached the quarter-finals of the PDC World Championship since his epic world title victory in 2003, while van Barneveld went on to defeat Phil Taylor 7–6 in a similarly momentous final. But for the rest of 2007, Part returned to some of his best form. He reached three semi-finals of televised majors: US Open; the World Grand Prix, and the Las Vegas Desert Classic (though he could not defend his title in the latter). These consistent performances meant he entered the 2008 PDC World Championship as the 11th seed, though he was not considered one of the favourites for the event. Nevertheless, Part advanced steadily through the tournament, setting the tournament's highest average in the second round against Mensur Suljović. He then came through a tight quarter-final against the 2007 PDC Player of the Year and third seed James Wade, winning in a deciding set 5–4. In the semi-final he faced Kevin Painter, reminiscent of his 2003 triumph; Part once again emerged victorious, 6–2 this time, and found himself in his fourth world championship final.

In a tournament where the contemporary superpowers of the game had faltered – Taylor had lost 5–4 to Wayne Mardle in the quarter-finals and reigning champion van Barneveld had been eliminated by Painter in the third round – it was perhaps not such a great surprise to see a 500–1 rank outsider facing Part in the final. Debutant Kirk Shepherd, a 21-year-old qualifier and the sport's youngest ever world-finalist, was Part's opponent. In a sense, Part's career had come full circle; the matchup recalled his 1994 final, though Part had moved from novice to established veteran and Shepherd, this time, was the young debutant. But Part was not to suffer the same fate as Bobby George had. While Shepherd had shown remarkable guile, moxie and perhaps good fortune in defeating stalwarts of the PDC's top 10, including Mardle, Peter Manley, and Terry Jenkins, the experience of Part proved a step too far. The Canadian raced into a 4–0 lead and though Shepherd brought the match back to 5–2, Part closed out the match before the comeback could become troubling, winning the final two sets for a 7–2 victory and a third world championship. Victory ensured he joined Taylor, van Barneveld, Eric Bristow and John Lowe as the fifth player to have won more than two world championships. With this win he also became the second player to have won the PDC World Championship more than once, after Taylor. Part also set a new record in becoming the first player to win the world championship in three venues – having won the 1994 BDO World Championship at the Lakeside, the 2003 PDC title at the Circus Tavern and in 2008 at Alexandra Palace.

However, Part had registered disappointing years following world championship wins in 1994 and 2003, and 2008 followed the same trend. Initially, Part enjoyed some success; just as in 2003, he won the first tournament he entered as world champion with a victory in the Gibraltar Players Championship. But it was to be his only PDC victory for the next two years. Invited into the Premier League for the second time, Part was in poor form throughout the tournament and finished bottom of the league. The results hardly improved, as Part's year was marked by early defeats in most televised tournaments despite his high seeding, most pointedly in the first round of the 2008 Las Vegas Desert Classic, a tournament that Part had thrived in for many years. To round off a terrible year, Part's world championship defence ended as disastrously as it had in 2004. In the 2009 PDC World Championship, he was drawn against American qualifier Bill Davis, but failed to win a set as his third world championship reign ended with a 3–0 defeat in the first round.

2009–2016: Nine-dart finish and slide in rankings 
Part was defeated in the first round of the 2009 World Championship, losing 3–0 to American Bill Davis – the second time in which Part has lost his first match in the World Championship, having won the title the previous year (he was knocked out by Mark Dudbridge in 2004 having won the title in 2003). Part was defeated by Kirk Shepherd in the second round of the 2010 World Championship in a repeat of the 2008 final, only recording a 76 average in a 4–1 loss. This result meant Part dropped down the rankings and did not appear in the 2010 Premier League.

In June 2010, Part came through a large field of players to win the PDC North American Darts Championship in Las Vegas. Part failed to get into the 2010 Grand Slam of Darts after Adrian Lewis surprisingly defeated Phil Taylor in the semi finals of the 2010 World Grand Prix. Part was whitewashed 0–3 by Danish qualifier Per Laursen in the 2011 World Championship and almost went out of the top 32.

He won his first players championship since 2007 in February 2011 in Derby convincingly beating Mark Walsh 6–0 with 104.86 average. On the previous day he narrowly missed double 12 for a 9 dart finish. Part stated "he had nothing to lose" and that illness had stopped him reaching where he wanted to be at the World Championships. Part's form continued when he won another players championship in May 2011 in Austria by thrashing Denis Ovens 6–0 in the final, having earlier overcoming Phil Taylor 6–2. The win granted him qualification for all the major televised tournaments in 2011, something which he failed to do in 2010 except for the UK Open.

During the first round of the 2011 World Matchplay, John hit a 9 Darter against Mark Webster and came from 7–1 down to within one leg at 9–8. He subsequently lost the match but hit a milestone in his darting career with his first ever televised perfect game.

He qualified for the World Grand Prix, in which he won his first round match against reigning World Champion Adrian Lewis. He lost in the last 16 against eventual finalist Brendan Dolan, 1–3.

At the 2012 World Championship he made it to the quarter-finals for the first time since his 2008 title. He dropped just three sets on his way to the last 8 by defeating John Henderson, Richie Burnett and Kevin Painter. He was involved in one of the greatest matches ever seen at the World Championships against James Wade. Wade opened up a 3–1 set lead, before his form started to dip to coincide with Part scoring heavier and hitting more doubles to win 3 sets in a row. The players broke each other's throws twice in the deciding set to require a sudden-death leg, which Wade managed to win. Part said afterwards that it was "the greatest game I've ever lost!".

Part represented Canada with Ken MacNeil in the 2012 PDC World Cup of Darts and together they were beaten 2–3 by England in the second round, having lost a sudden death leg.

Part won the first PDC North American pro tour event in July 2012, beating top American player Darin Young 6 legs to 1 in the final in Chicago.

Part nevertheless had one of the quietest seasons of his career, as he didn't qualify in any of the majors tournaments. However, he was invited to play at the Grand Slam of Darts in which he managed to win 2 out of 3 matches to qualify for the second round (despite a meagre average of 81 for his three-round robin matches). He eventually reached the Quarter-Finals stages. Defeating Brendan Dolan 10–6 in the last 16 before losing to Andy Hamilton 12–16.

Despite this season, he was ranked 26th at the World Championships and whitewashed Joe Cullen 3–0 in the first round, before being defeated by Terry Jenkins 1–4 in the second.

Part again represented Canada in the 2013 PDC World Cup of Darts, this time with Jeff Smith. With a win over Sweden and a loss over Scotland, they progressed to the second round in which they were beaten 5–2 by Mark Webster and Richie Burnett. However, bigger success came soon, as Part won the first European Tour event of 2013, the UK Masters. Wins over Kim Huybrechts, Gary Anderson, Mensur Suljović, Simon Whitlock and Adrian Lewis saw Part progress to the final where opponent Stuart Kellett was waiting. With a 6–4 win Part claimed his first PDC ranking title since 2011.

At the European Darts Trophy  in Sindelfingen (Germany) Part reached the quarter finals after defeating Vincent van der Voort, Robert Thornton and Ronnie Baxter. Dutchman Michael van Gerwen ended his chance to win a second successive European Tour event.
At the seventh UK Open Qualifier in April, Part won seven games to reach the final which he lost 2–6 to Kim Huybrechts. He was beaten 4–9 in the fourth round of the 2013 UK Open by Andy Hamilton, having led 3–0.

He qualified for the European Championship and lost in the first round 4–6 to Kevin Painter, despite hitting a 170 checkout and having a dart at the bullseye for a second one to lead 5–4. He then qualified for the World Matchplay for the first time in two years. He faced James Wade in his first round match and, despite establishing a lead in the early stages, he lost 8–10.

He qualified for the World Grand Prix, but was unable to win his first round match, as he was facing Michael van Gerwen who managed to win the match with a tremendous 104 average.

His next televised championship was the Players Championship Finals. He earned enough money to be in the top 32 on the PDC Tour and played his first round match against Andy Hamilton. It was the first match where Part wore glasses. It worked for his scoring as he hit seventeen 100+ and three 180s, and he established a 5–1 lead against Hamilton, who wasn't at his best form, averaging under 70 in the five first legs. But Part's finishing was the last word of his defeat, as he hit only 13% of his doubles in the five legs he won and missed a total of 18 darts for the match when his opponent found form again to win the match 6–5 with a 158 checkout in the deciding leg.

He entered the 2014 World Championship as the 25th seed and played Mareno Michels in the first round, he won the first two sets of the match and then started to struggle with scoring and finishing. His opponent won the two next sets to force Part playing a deciding set. He won it 3–1 in legs and won the match with an 82 average. He then suffered a 0–4 defeat against Wes Newton in the last 32. At the end of the season, he finished ranked 28th.

2014 season was not good for John Part as he could only reach two quarter finals out of a strings of Pro Tour and European Tour championships. He didn't qualify for any televised ranking tournament. He almost went out of the Top 32 in the Order of Merit, having lost 10 places in more than a year, slipping from 21st to 31st.
He still qualified for the 2015 World championships where he was beaten 2–3 by 22 years old newcomer Keegan Brown, despite John Part's fightback from 0–2 to 2–2. He was still in the top 32 after the Tournament.

After the 2015 UK Open, he went out of the top 32.

Part failed to qualify for the 2016 World Championship. This is the first time Part failed to qualify for the event after 22 consecutive years in the tournament.

2017–present: Hall of Fame and televised return 
In January 2017, Part was inducted into the PDC Hall of Fame. He was the fourteenth inductee and the first from outside of the United Kingdom – fitting with his World Championship victories. The award acknowledged his achievements, his contributions as a commentator and pundit, and gentlemanly conduct throughout his career. In the same month, he entered the PDC Qualifying School to gain a tour card having fallen out of the world's top 64. Part won through on the third day; beating Kirk Shepherd at the final stage in a rematch of the 2008 World Championship final. In March 2017, Part returned to Unicorn darts after switching to Cosmo darts, joining fellow World Champions for the company Gary Anderson, John Lowe and Bob Anderson. His success in Qualifying School did not transfer to his 2017 season, where he failed to progress beyond the last 32 stage of a singles event, taking just £2,250 in prize money in the calendar year. His best showing of the year was at the World Cup of Darts, where he lost in the second round to the Austrian team with his partner, John Norman Jr.

Competing in the six qualifiers for the 2018 UK Open, Part reached the last 32 stage of the fourth event. The £750 prize money for this was enough for him to qualify as one of the 128 players to take part in the televised stages of the tournament, his first since the 2015 UK Open three years previously. He beat two amateur qualifiers in the first two rounds of the tournament, and followed those wins up with wins over David Evans, Ron Meulenkamp and Mervyn King to reach his first televised quarter final since the 2012 Grand Slam of Darts, and his first quarter-final in any PDC event since the 2014 Austrian Darts Open. He lost at the quarter-final stage to Robert Owen. The £11,500 prize money he collected for this result is his highest earnings from a single event since the 2013 PDC UK Masters, also held at Butlin's Minehead.

2020
Since January 2020 PDC Q school he has not participated in any darts tournament.

Television commentary

In June 1994, BBC commentator Sid Waddell decided to leave the BBC to join Sky Sports. This left just Tony Green as the only darts commentator at the BBC. Part is considered to be one of the game's best "counters" or "spotters" (the ability to work out scoring shots or where the next dart may be thrown). This knowledge is essential to a darts commentator and contributed to Part being chosen by the BBC to join Green in the commentary box during the latter stages of the 1995 Embassy World Championship. 

Part continued to commentate on the BDO World Championship even after he started playing in the rival PDC event shown on Sky Sports. He said: "The BDO weren't too thrilled but the BBC didn't care at all. They made sure I was back for them." Part commentated on the BDO World Championship for the BBC from 1995 to 2007. He also commentated on the BBC's coverage of the World Masters from 2001 to 2004, and again in 2006. He missed commentating on the 2005 World Masters because he was in Ireland preparing to play in the 2005 World Grand Prix, and missed commentating on the 2007 World Masters due to competing in the 2007 Grand Slam of Darts. Part then left the BBC commentary team.

In 2012, Part returned to commentary as he was employed by ESPN for the 2012 European Championship.

Part started commentating for Sky Sports at the 2013 World Matchplay, and has since become a regular member of Sky's commentary team.

During the 2021 PDC World Darts Championship Round of 16 clash between 3 Time World Champion Michael van Gerwen and Joe Cullen, Part identified that he had suffered with 'Tungsten Tension' throughout his career. As a result of this, Part encountered severe headaches during pressure moments which had "cost him games of the highest order." This honesty and transparency gained the support of dartitis advocate Wayne Mardle who said that "Part's legendary status is only enhanced by this revelation."

Career finals

BDO major finals: 1 (1 title)

PDC major finals: 10 (3 titles, 7 runners-up)

PDC European tour finals: (1 title)

World championship performances

BDO
 1994: Winner (beat Bobby George 6–0)
 1995: 2nd Round (lost to Paul Williams 2–3)
 1996: 2nd Round (lost to Steve Beaton 0–3)
 1997: 2nd Round (lost to Roger Carter 1–3)

PDC

WSDT
 2022: Second round (lost to John Walton 1–3)
 2023: Second round (lost to Darryl Fitton 2–3)

Nine-dart finishes

Career statistics

(W) Won; (F) finalist; (SF) semifinalist; (QF) quarterfinalist; (#R) rounds 6, 5, 4, 3, 2, 1; (RR) round-robin stage; (Prel.) Preliminary round; (DNQ) Did not qualify; (DNP) Did not participate; (NH) Not held

Performance timeline

References

External links

John Part's helpful darting series offering advice on how to play and practice the sport

Canadian darts players
PDC world darts champions
1966 births
Living people
Sportspeople from Toronto
Professional Darts Corporation former tour card holders
British Darts Organisation players
Canadian sports announcers
Darts commentators
BDO world darts champions
Las Vegas Desert Classic champions
Darts players who have thrown televised nine-dart games
PDC World Cup of Darts Canadian team
Professional Darts Corporation Hall of Fame